The Cambridge Seven were six students from Cambridge University and one from the Royal Military Academy, who in 1885, decided to become missionaries to China through the China Inland Mission. The seven were:

Charles Thomas Studd
Montagu Harry Proctor Beauchamp
Stanley P. Smith
Arthur T. Polhill-Turner
Dixon Edward Hoste
Cecil H. Polhill-Turner
William Wharton Cassels

Preparations in Britain

Having been accepted as missionaries by Hudson Taylor of the China Inland Mission the seven were scheduled to leave for China in early February 1885. Before leaving the seven held a farewell tour to spread the message across the country – it was during this tour that someone dubbed them "The Cambridge Seven."

For the next month, the seven toured the University campuses of England and Scotland, holding meetings for the students. Queen Victoria was pleased to receive their booklet containing The Cambridge Seven's testimonies.  The record of their departure is recorded in "The Evangelisation of the World: A Missionary Band". It became a national bestseller. Their influence extended to America where it led to the formation of Robert Wilder's Student Volunteer Movement.

All seven had become born-again Christians and were moved by their beliefs to go to China in 1885 to spread these beliefs and to help the local population; most remained in or connected to missionary work for the rest of their lives. They were greatly influenced by Taylor's book China's Spiritual Need and Claims. After their acceptance into the China Inland Mission, the seven toured England and Scotland, preaching and appealing to their listeners to follow their example and follow Christ. Charles Studd's brother Kynaston helped the seven in their preparations for departure.

Assessment
The conversion and example of the seven was one of the grand gestures of 19th-century missions, making them religious celebrities; as a result, their story was published as "The Evangelisation of the World" and was distributed to every YMCA and YWCA throughout the British Empire and the United States.

Though their time together was brief, they helped catapult the China Inland Mission from obscurity to "almost embarrassing prominence", and their work helped to inspire many recruits for the CIM and other mission societies. In 1885, when the Seven first arrived in China, the CIM had 163 missionaries; this had doubled by 1890 and reached some 800 by 1900, which represented one-third of the entire Protestant missionary force.

Work
The Cambridge Seven arrived in Shanghai on 18 March 1885 and engaged in a variety of ministries throughout China:
William Wharton Cassels worked in China for ten years and then returned to England in 1895 where he was consecrated as the new Bishop of a new diocese in Western China (Szechwan). He then returned to Western China – he lived there until his death in 1925, and was buried in the garden of the diocesan cathedral.
Stanley Peregrine Smith was sent to North China. There he learned Chinese language and soon became as fluent a preacher in Chinese as he was in English. He died in China on 31 January 1931.
Charles Studd, one of the famous Studd brothers, who was before his missionary work well known as an England cricketer – having played in the famous Ashes series against Australia, was probably the best known of "The Cambridge Seven." He was sent home because of ill health in 1894.  Later he worked in India and Africa and was the founder of WEC.  He died in 1931.
Arthur T. Polhill-Turner was ordained as a minister in 1888 and moved to the densely populated countryside of Szechwan to reach as many people as he could. He remained in China throughout the uprisings against foreigners at the turn of the century and did not leave there until 1928, when he retired and returned to England. He died in 1935.
Cecil H. Polhill-Turner stayed in the same province with the others for a while before moving to the northwest, in the direction of Tibet. During a violent riot there he and his wife were both nearly killed in 1892. In 1900, his health failed and he was sent home to England where he was strongly advised against a return to China. Despite this ban, his heart remained there and throughout the rest of his life, he made seven prolonged missionary visits. In 1908 in Sunderland he became the leader of the Pentecostal Missionary Union and was greatly used in the formation of the Pentecostal Movement in Britain. He died in England in 1938.
Montagu Harry Proctor Beauchamp was evacuated from China in 1900 because of the uprisings but returned to China in 1902. He then returned to England in 1911 and served as a chaplain with the British Army and Vicar of Monkton Combe in Somerset. His son became a second-generation missionary in China and in 1935 he returned to China; he died at his son's mission station in 1939, in Paoning, and was buried in the cemetery of St John's Cathedral.
Dixon Hoste was the only one of the Cambridge Seven who was not educated at Cambridge.  He succeeded Hudson Taylor as the Director of the China Inland Mission and for thirty years, he led the Mission. He retired in 1935 but remained in China until 1945, when he was interned by the Japanese. He died in London, in May 1946 and was the last member of "The Cambridge Seven" to die.

See also
 Anglicanism in Sichuan
 Historical Bibliography of the China Inland Mission
 Anglo-Chinese relations
 OMF International
 Cambridge Inter-Collegiate Christian Union

References

Protestant missionaries in China
British Protestant missionaries
British expatriates in China
People associated with the University of Cambridge
History of Cambridge